Wybalenna may refer to:

Wybalenna Aboriginal Establishment on Flinders Island, off the north eastern tip of Tasmania
Wybalenna Island, four small islands off the west coast of Flinders Island.